The following lists events that happened during 1826 in Australia.

Incumbents
Monarch - George IV

Governors
Governors of the Australian colonies:
Governor of New South Wales - Lieutenant-General Ralph Darling
Governor of Tasmania - Colonel George Arthur

Events
 16 March - The Australian Subscription Library, the forerunner of the State Library of New South Wales, is founded; it opens, 1 December 1827.
 25 December - Major Edmund Lockyer arrives at King George Sound to take possession of the western part of the continent, establishing a settlement near Albany.
 Convict Hospital built in Brisbane, it is replaced as Brisbane General Hospital in 1867.

Science and technology
 7 April – Australia's first street lamp erected in Macquarie Place, Sydney – it burned whale oil.

Births
 10 April – Henry Oxley, New South Wales MP
 24 June – George Goyder, surveyor-general of South Australia.
 7 July – Charles Todd responsible for the Australian Overland Telegraph Line.

Deaths
 4 May - Bushranger Matthew Brady is hanged.

References

 
Australia
Years of the 19th century in Australia